Wojciech Kałdowski (born 16 April 1976 in Miastko) is a retired Polish middle-distance runner who specialized in the 800 metres.

He won the bronze medals at the 1995 European Junior Championships and the 1996 European Indoor Championships and finished sixth at the 1998 European Championships.

His personal best time is 1:45.56 minutes, achieved in August 1999 in Sopot.

Competition record

External links

1976 births
Living people
Polish male middle-distance runners
People from Miastko
Lechia Gdańsk athletes
20th-century Polish people
21st-century Polish people